Le Manège enchanté (British English: "The Magic Roundabout", American English: "The Magic Carousel") is a popular French animated children's television series of hundreds of episodes each five minutes long, which premiered on October 5, 1963, on the first channel of the ORTF. Serge Danot created the series.

The series features characters in the make-believe land of Bois-Joli: Père Pivoine, the owner of the roundabout; Zébulon, a jack-in-the-box; Pollux the British dog; Azalée the cow; Ambroise the snail; Flappy the Spanish rabbit; Margote, a girl; and Jouvence Pio, a gardener who starts every sentence with "Hep Hep Hep".

The footage was used by the BBC to produce an English-language version, The Magic Roundabout, using scripts that bore little relation to the original story lines.

Production
The programmes were created by stop motion animation with puppets used for the characters. The first season consisted of about 39 episodes. The initial episodes were filmed in black and white. After Danot's departure in 1967, a second series of 100 episodes was broadcast in 1971.

In 1989 another 250 episodes were produced by AB Groupe for the La Cinq channel.

Voices
 Jacques Bodoin : Pollux / Flappy / Ambroise / Zébulon (1963–1966)
 Bernard Haller : Pollux (1966)
 Christian Riehl: Pollux (1966–1990)
 Micheline Dax: Azalée (1963–1966)
 Pascaline Priou: Azalée (1966–?)
 Patricia Danot: Margote (1963–1990)
 Serge Danot: Ambroise (1966–?)

Films and revival
 Dougal and the Blue Cat, French animated film directed by Serge Danot in 1972
 The Magic Roundabout, Franco-British animated film, released in 2005

The series was revived using computer animation. 52 episodes aired from September 2006 on Disney Junior and from 2 April 2006 on M6.

See also
 List of French animated television series

References

External links
  
 Le Manège enchanté (1963)  on AlloCiné
 Le Manège enchanté (2006)  on AlloCiné
 Le Manège enchanté  on Planète Jeunesse

1963 French television series debuts
1990 French television series endings
2006 French television series debuts
2010 French television series endings
1960s French animated television series
1970s French animated television series
1980s French animated television series
1990s French animated television series
2000s French animated television series
2010s French animated television series
French computer-animated television series
French children's animated fantasy television series
French children's animated comedy television series
Stop-motion animated television series
Television shows adapted into films
French-language television shows